Basalia is a genus of moths of the family Erebidae erected by Michael Fibiger in 2008.

Species
Basalia nilgiroides Fibiger, 2008
Basalia serius Fibiger, 2008
Basalia cucullatelloides Fibiger, 2008
Basalia melanosticta (Hampson, 1907)

References

Micronoctuini
Noctuoidea genera